Ceratias uranoscopus, commonly known as the stargazing seadevil, is a species of sea devil, a type of anglerfish. It is endemic to tropical waters and can be found in the Atlantic, Pacific, and Indian Oceans.

References

Ceratiidae
Deep sea fish
Fish described in 1877